The Spectrum Patrol Car (SPC) or Spectrum Saloon Car (SSC) is a fictional vehicle that appears in Gerry Anderson's science-fiction television series Captain Scarlet and the Mysterons (1967) and in revamped form in the remake Gerry Anderson's New Captain Scarlet (2005).

Depiction

Captain Scarlet
The car is specially equipped with quartz headlights that permit the driver to see long distances in the dark. The vehicle also features transverse gearing, independent suspension and magnetic drums that provide powerful control braking by means of electromagnetically-generated opposing magnetic fields. The road-tyre friction heat at high speeds is countered by wing intakes, while a central housing and rear-mounted fin maintain the vehicle's stability at speed.

The original script for the first episode provided little in terms of specification for the vehicle, merely describing it as a "modern American saloon car". It was one of several minor Spectrum vehicles whose design the series' special effects director, Derek Meddings, delegated to his assistant, Mike Trim, because he assumed that they would not appear in any other episodes. In the end, however, Trim's concepts for the car and the other vehicles (the Spectrum Helicopter, Passenger Jet and Maximum Security Vehicle) were so well received that they became recurring elements of the series.

New Captain Scarlet
In the CGI series Gerry Anderson's New Captain Scarlet (2005), the SPC's successor is known as the Spectrum Cheetah. While the updated vehicle strongly resembles the SPC, it has an added capability: it is equipped with extendable wings, a tail fin and booster rockets that, once deployed, allow the car to glide over obstructions that it encounters on the road.

Reception
In 2015, James Taylor of Car magazine ranked the SPC one of the top 10 vehicles from the Gerry Anderson productions, likening it to "a cross between a Plymouth Superbird and a hearse, topped by a D-type-shaming tail fin". However, he argued that the car's split windscreen would have made for poor forward visibility.

Toys
Since the 1960s the SPC has been released in toy form by various manufacturers. Products include a plastic friction-drive toy by Century 21 Toys, a die-cast model by Dinky (which continued to be produced until 1974) and newer versions by Vivid Imaginations and Corgi.

References

Works cited

External links
 Spectrum Headquarters: Spectrum Saloon Car

Captain Scarlet (franchise)
Fictional cars
Fictional elements introduced in 1967